The 2012 e-Boks Open was the third and final edition of the tennis tournament e-Boks Danish Open, an international-level tournament on the 2012 WTA Tour. It took place on indoor hard courts in Farum, Denmark between 9 and 15 April 2012.

Singles main-draw entrants

Seeds

 1 Rankings are as of April 2, 2012

Other entrants
The following players received wildcards into the main draw:
 Karen Barbat
 Malou Ejdesgaard
 Yulia Putintseva

The following players received entry from the qualifying draw:
 Annika Beck
 Anna Chakvetadze
 Melinda Czink
 Johanna Konta

Withdrawals
  Mandy Minella (back injury)
  Galina Voskoboeva

Retirements
  Ksenia Pervak (gastritis)

Doubles main-draw entrants

Seeds

1 Rankings are as of April 2, 2012

Other entrants
The following pairs received wildcards into the doubles main draw:
  Karen Barbat /  Mai Grage
  Malou Ejdesgaard /  Caroline Wozniacki
The following pair received entry as alternates:
  Maria Abramović /  Daniella Jeflea

Withdrawals
  Kristina Mladenovic (right ankle injury)

Finals

Singles

 Angelique Kerber defeated  Caroline Wozniacki, 6–4, 6–4
 It was Kerber's 2nd career title.

Doubles

 Kimiko Date-Krumm /  Rika Fujiwara defeated  Sofia Arvidsson /  Kaia Kanepi, 6–2, 4–6, [10–5]

References

External links 
 

e-Boks Open
2012 E-Boks Danish Open
2012 in Danish tennis